Kristof Goddaert (21 November 1986 – 18 February 2014) was a Belgian road racing cyclist who competed as a professional between 2008 and 2014 for the ,  and  squads.

Born in Sint Niklaas, Belgium, Goddaert left  at the end of the 2012 season, and joined the new  team for the 2013 season.

On 18 February 2014, Goddaert was killed during a training ride in Antwerp, when he fell from his bike and was struck by a De Lijn bus.

Major results

2007
 3rd Nationale Sluitingsprijs
2008
 2nd Tour de Vendée
 4th Omloop van de Vlaamse Scheldeboorden
 5th Memorial Rik Van Steenbergen
 9th Paris–Tours
2009
 3rd Paris–Brussels
 7th Memorial Rik Van Steenbergen
 7th Munsterland Giro
 7th Omloop van het Houtland
2010
 1st Stage 3 Tour de Wallonie
 5th Le Samyn
2011
 8th Gent–Wevelgem
2012
 2nd Road race, National Road Championships
 5th Tro Bro Leon
 7th Halle–Ingooigem
2013
 7th Grote Prijs Wase Polders
 8th Overall Tour de l'Eurometropole

References

External links

 
 
 
 CyclingNews
 Kristof Goddaert's profile on Cycling Base

Belgian male cyclists
1986 births
2014 deaths
Sportspeople from Sint-Niklaas
Cyclists from East Flanders
Cycling road incident deaths
Road incident deaths in Belgium